The Fremont RE-2 School District is a school district headquartered in Florence, Colorado. It serves Florence and Penrose.

Schools
Florence Junior/Senior High School
Fremont Elementary School
Penrose Elementary School

References

External links
 Fremont RE-2 School District

Education in Fremont County, Colorado
School districts in Colorado